Colonial Heights is a census-designated place (CDP) in Sullivan County, Tennessee, United States. It is surrounded by the city of Kingsport.

The population was 3,055 at the 2020 census down from 6,934 at the 2010 census, due to annexation by the city of Kingsport.

It is part of the Kingsport–Bristol (TN)–Bristol (VA) Metropolitan Statistical Area, which is a component of the Johnson City–Kingsport–Bristol, TN-VA Combined Statistical Area – commonly known as the "Tri-Cities" region.

Geography
Colonial Heights is located at  (36.477769, -82.505278).

Demographics

2020 census

As of the 2020 United States census, there were 3,055 people, 1,318 households, and 956 families residing in the CDP.

2000 census
As of the census of 2000, there were 7,067 people, 2,811 households, and 2,217 families residing in the CDP. The population density was 1,086.5 people per square mile (419.8/km2). There were 2,936 housing units at an average density of 451.4/sq mi (174.4/km2). The racial makeup of the CDP was 97.59% White, 0.88% African American, 0.16% Native American, 0.67% Asian, 0.03% Pacific Islander, 0.20% from other races, and 0.48% from two or more races. Hispanic or Latino of any race were 0.72% of the population.

There were 2,811 households, out of which 31.5% had children under the age of 18 living with them, 68.9% were married couples living together, 7.6% had a female householder with no husband present, and 21.1% were non-families. 18.7% of all households were made up of individuals, and 7.2% had someone living alone who was 65 years of age or older. The average household size was 2.51 and the average family size was 2.86.

In the CDP, the population was spread out, with 23.1% under the age of 18, 5.8% from 18 to 24, 27.8% from 25 to 44, 28.5% from 45 to 64, and 14.8% who were 65 years of age or older. The median age was 41 years. For every 100 females, there were 94.0 males. For every 100 females age 18 and over, there were 91.7 males.

The median income for a household in the CDP was $48,145, and the median income for a family was $53,651. Males had a median income of $41,604 versus $25,045 for females. The per capita income for the CDP was $26,210. About 4.8% of families and 6.2% of the population were below the poverty line, including 8.4% of those under age 18 and 4.2% of those age 65 or over.

References

Census-designated places in Sullivan County, Tennessee
Census-designated places in Tennessee
Kingsport–Bristol metropolitan area
Kingsport, Tennessee